Anna Salnikova (born January 11, 1987) is a Georgian swimmer, who specialized in breaststroke events. She represented her nation Georgia at the 2008 Summer Olympics, and held a Georgian national record in both the 50 and 100 m breaststroke until they were later broken by Teona Bostashvili in two separate editions of the World Championships (2013 and 2015).

Salnikova received a wild card invitation from FINA to compete as a lone Georgian female swimmer in the 100 m breaststroke at the 2008 Summer Olympics in Beijing. Tying for first at the initial length of the opening heat, she fought off a sprint challenge from Libya's Asmahan Farhat by just the slimmest of the margins for the top spot, but nearly faded down the last stroke to touch the wall with a second-place time in 1:21.70. Salnikova failed to advance to the semifinals, as she placed forty-eighth overall in the preliminary heats.

References

External links
NBC Olympics Profile

1987 births
Living people
Female swimmers from Georgia (country)
Olympic swimmers of Georgia (country)
Swimmers at the 2008 Summer Olympics
Female breaststroke swimmers
Sportspeople from Tbilisi